Joshua Kopelman is an American entrepreneur, venture capitalist, and philanthropist.

Kopelman is best known as a founder of First Round Capital, a pioneering seed-stage venture fund that led the seed round in Uber.  Josh has consistently been ranked as one of the top 20 Venture Capitalists in the world.  Before founding First Round, Josh was a founder of Half.com, a fixed price marketplace connecting buyers and sellers of used books, movies and music products.  In 2000, Kopelman sold Half.com to eBay.

Early life
Kopelman grew up in Great Neck, New York, the son of Carol and Dr. Richard Kopelman. His father was a professor at Baruch College and his mother a real estate broker. He attended the Wharton School at the University of Pennsylvania and graduated in 1993.

Career 

In 1992, during his sophomore year, Kopelman co-founded Infonautics Corporation, in Wayne, Pennsylvania. In 1996, Infonautics went public on the NASDAQ stock exchange.  Kopelman left Infonautics in 1999 to found Half.com.

After selling Half.com to eBay, Kopelman remained with eBay for three years.  In 2004, Josh co-founded TurnTide an anti-spam technology company that was acquired by Symantec.

Josh is an inventor on sixteen U.S. Patents for his work in Internet technology.  Josh was ranked 3rd on the 2018 New York Times list of Top Venture Capitalists and consistently ranks in the top 20 of the Forbes Midas List of the top 100 tech investors (#18 in 2011, #6 in 2012, #12 in 2013, #11 in 2014, #4 in 2015, #6 in 2016, #35 in 2017, #19 in 2018, #39 in 2019, and #79 in 2020). Josh has been named as one of the top ten ‘angel investors’ in the United States by Newsweek magazine, one of "Tech's New Kingmakers" by Business 2.0 magazine  and a "Rising VC Star" by Fortune magazine. Josh also is the proud winner of a second place ribbon in the 2011 Nantucket Watermelon Eating competition.

Kopelman is currently Managing Director of First Round Capital, a seed-stage venture fund. He is an investor, director and advisor to a variety of businesses, most in the software and Internet domain, including OnDeck Capital, Flatiron Health, Aster Data Systems, Knewton, Gigya, AltSchool, The Black Tux, Five Below, Massdrop, Like.com, IronPort, Mint.com, Monetate, LinkedIn, ModCloth, AppNexus, BankSimple, Swipely, True & Co., Wanelo, Warby Parker, Ring.com, Numerai, OpenX, LiveOps, Boxed.com, Clover Health, Upstart and Discourse.

In 2007, Kopelman helped to coin the phrase the Implicit Web to better describe the Semantic Web.

Personal life 
In 1995, Josh married Rena Cohen, an attorney, in Great Neck, New York. In 2001, Josh and his wife created the Kopelman Foundation, a non-profit philanthropic organization to provide “start-up” grants to social entrepreneurs. In 2002, the Kopelman Foundation funded a project to digitize and host the complete text of the Jewish Encyclopedia online.  In 2016, Josh was elected Chairman of the Board of Directors of the Philadelphia Inquirer.

Kopelman currently lives in a suburb of Philadelphia, Pennsylvania with his wife and two children.

References

External links
 Redeye VC - Josh Kopelman's Blog
 
 First Round Capital management page including a brief biography of Kopelman
 The Kopelman Foundation
 Midas Capital Kopelman's private investment fund, which preceded First Round Capital
 Video interview with Josh Kopelman on the 10th anniversary of Half.com

Living people
American computer businesspeople
American Internet company founders
American technology chief executives
American venture capitalists
Businesspeople from New York (state)
EBay
IronPort people
Jewish American philanthropists
People from Great Neck, New York
Wharton School of the University of Pennsylvania alumni
Philanthropists from New York (state)
Year of birth missing (living people)
21st-century American Jews